Nano (symbol n) is a unit prefix meaning one billionth. It is frequently encountered in science and electronics for prefixing units of time and length.

Examples
 Three gold atoms lined up are about one nanometer (nm) long.
 One nanosecond (ns) is about the time required for light to travel 30 cm in air, or 20 cm in an optical fiber. 
 One nanometer per second (nm/s) is approximately the speed that a fingernail grows.

The prefix derives from the Greek  (Latin ), meaning "dwarf". The General Conference on Weights and Measures (CGPM) officially endorsed the usage of nano as a standard prefix in 1960.

When used as a prefix for something other than a unit of measure  (as for example in words like "nanoscience"), nano refers to nanotechnology, or means "on a scale of nanometres" (nanoscale).

Nanometre

Nanosecond

See also 
 RKM code

References 

SI prefixes

simple:Nano-